The 2018 Columbus Crew SC season was the club's twenty-third season of existence, and their twenty-third consecutive season in Major League Soccer, the top flight of American soccer. Columbus also competed in the U.S. Open Cup, and took part in the Pacific Rim Cup and Carolina Challenge Cup during preseason. The season covered the period from November 30, 2017 to the start of the 2019 Major League Soccer season.

Columbus finished in third place in the inaugural Pacific Rim Cup during preseason. Facing a pair of Japanese opponents, Crew SC were defeated by Hokkaido Consadole Sapporo in the semifinals, but bounced back with a victory over Iwaki FC in the consolation game. Columbus then took part in the Carolina Challenge Cup, winning that title for the second consecutive season. Crew SC won all three matches in the tournament, claiming the CCC championship for the third time in club history.

Columbus additionally won each of their midseason rivalry matches, defeating Toronto FC across two games for the Trillium Cup and dispatching FC Dallas on tiebreakers to defend the Lamar Hunt Pioneer Cup. Against Toronto, Columbus was trailing in the aggregate series by a 3–2 line inside of the final 30 minutes of the season series; the Crew put in three late goals to tie the match and win the cup. The match against Dallas ended in a scoreless draw, with Columbus retaining the cup based on the head-to-head goals tiebreaker. Crew SC won the Pioneer Cup for the seventh time that it had been contested.

Columbus qualified for the playoffs for the second consecutive season, again finishing in fifth place in the Eastern Conference. Just as in 2017, Crew SC was victorious in a penalty shootout on the road in the knockout round, this time advancing past D.C. United with goalkeeper Zack Steffen making two saves. However, Columbus was eliminated in the conference semifinals by New York Red Bulls after suffering a 3–0 defeat in the second leg. In the U.S. Open Cup, Crew SC were eliminated in the fourth round by Chicago Fire, with the tie coming down to a penalty shootout. Crew SC goalkeeper Logan Ketterer had his shot saved in the eleventh round of kicks.

Background

Overshadowing the season for Columbus was a threat by owner Anthony Precourt to move the team to Austin, Texas; Precourt had announced the proposed move in October 2017, five days before the team's final regular season game. The #SavetheCrew movement had been created in the aftermath of this proposed move.

Two days after the 2018 regular season began, Ohio Attorney General Mike DeWine and the City of Columbus filed a lawsuit against Precourt, citing a 1996 state law that prevents sports teams that benefited from public facilities or financial assistance from relocating to another city without a six-month notice and attempting to sell the team to a local ownership group. The lawsuit worked its way through the courts throughout the 2018 season.

On October 12, 2018, with two games remaining in the regular season, the owner of the Cleveland Browns (Jimmy Haslam) released a statement stating he, along with other local groups, was in the process of buying the Crew. MLS later released a statement stating their willingness to keep the Crew in Columbus, and that Precourt would get the rights to start a team in Austin if the deal went through.

Roster

Non-competitive

Preseason
On October 5, 2017, Crew SC were announced as a participant in the 2018 Carolina Challenge Cup, the fifth time that the club was to participate in the tournament. Columbus entered the event as defending champions. On November 13, 2017, the club announced that they would also take part in the inaugural Pacific Rim Cup during preseason. Crew SC were joined by Vancouver Whitecaps FC from MLS, as well as Hokkaido Consadole Sapporo and Iwaki FC from Japan. Columbus was drawn against Consadole Sapporo, with the winner advancing to the championship match and the loser going to the third place match.

Midseason

Competitive

MLS

Standings

Eastern Conference

Overall table

Aggregate table

Results summary

Results by round

Match results
On December 19, 2017, the league announced the home openers for every club. Just like in 2016, Columbus opened the season on the road against the defending MLS Cup champions, playing at Toronto FC in the first match of the MLS season. Columbus then opened the season at home on March 10, facing Montreal Impact.

The schedule for the remainder of the 2018 season was released on January 4, 2018. Crew SC played three times against Chicago Fire and Philadelphia Union, twice against every other Eastern Conference club, and once against every Western Conference club.

Postseason

U.S. Open Cup

Statistics

Appearances and goals
Federico Higuaín entered the season sitting fifth in club history for most goals, needing three to pass Edson Buddle for fourth all-time. He tallied a penalty kick against Chicago on May 12, cracking the tie with Buddle. Higuaín had also begun the year having appeared 163 times for Crew SC, needing seven appearances to crack the top ten in club history. He started each of the first ten games, leaping Frankie Hejduk for ninth place. By the end of the season, Higuaín moved up the charts in all three categories: eighth all-time in appearances, with 196; third all-time in goals, with 58; and second all-time in assists, with 64.

Upon his return to the club midway through the season, Justin Meram had the chance to add to his previous totals with the club; he sat fifth in appearances, sixth in goals, and tied for seventh in assists. He needed to play 28 times, score ten goals, or tally six assists in order to move up the charts. At the end of the year, Meram still sat fifth in appearances (with 225) and sixth in goals (with 43), but had taken sole possession of seventh in assists (with 36).

Wil Trapp began the season having appeared 144 times in all competitions for Crew SC, needing to play in 27 games to crack the all-time top ten. Although he missed several games while on international duty, Trapp appeared for the 27th time on the season in a draw with Philadelphia on September 29. He initially jumped into the table in a tie for tenth place with Hejduk. By the end of the season, Trapp had appeared in 177 games for the club, enough for sole possession of tenth.

Disciplinary record

Clean sheets
Zack Steffen entered the season with the seventh-most clean sheets in club history. He needed to keep two on the season in order to pass Brad Friedel for sixth all-time, which he did just three games into the campaign. Three saves in a scoreless draw with Philadelphia on March 17 moved Steffen up on the all-time chart. He promptly passed Mark Dougherty for fifth place, thanks to a 1–0 victory over the Union on May 9. Steffen finished the season with 22 career shutouts for Crew SC, good for fifth place in club history.

Transfers

In

SuperDraft

The following players were selected by Columbus in the MLS SuperDraft, but did not sign a contract with the club.

Loan in

Out

Loan out

Awards

MLS Team of the Week

MLS Player of the Week

MLS Player of the Month

MLS Goal of the Week

2018 MLS All-Star Game
 GK Zack Steffen

Postseason
MLS Goalkeeper of the Year Award
 GK Zack Steffen

MLS Comeback Player of the Year Award
 FW Gyasi Zardes

MLS Best XI
 GK Zack Steffen

Crew SC Team Awards
 Most Valuable Player – Gyasi Zardes
 Golden Boot Winner – Gyasi Zardes
 Defender of the Year – Jonathan Mensah
 Kirk Urso Heart Award – Connor Maloney
 Humanitarian of the Year – Wil Trapp
 Academy Player of the Year – Keegan Hughes

Kits

See also
 Columbus Crew SC
 2018 in American soccer
 2018 Major League Soccer season

References

Columbus Crew seasons
Columbus Crew SC
Columbus Crew SC
Columbus Crew SC